Kim Harris (born 24 January 1952) is an Australian cricketer. He played in eleven first-class matches for South Australia between 1981 and 1984.

See also
 List of South Australian representative cricketers

References

External links
 

1952 births
Living people
Australian cricketers
South Australia cricketers
Cricketers from Adelaide